The Evangelical Theological Society (ETS) is a professional society of Biblical scholars, educators, pastors, and students "devoted to the inerrancy and inspiration of the Scriptures and the gospel of Jesus Christ" and "dedicated to the oral exchange and written expression of theological thought and research."

History
The society was established in 1949 in response to a "keenly perceived need for interaction and wider dissemination of conservative research on biblical and theological issues." The inaugural meeting was held in Cincinnati and was organized by a committee chaired by Edward R. Dalglish, of Gordon Divinity School. The group, representing approximately 20 different institutions and denominations, elected Clarence Bouma, of Calvin Seminary, as its first president.

Several times during its history, the society has been faced with doctrinal controversy. In the 1970s, members became polarized over the precise definition of "inerrancy" (including questions about literal vs. non-literal language and the possibility of scribal errors). In 1983 the society expelled Robert Gundry for his views on the historicity of some of the events in the Gospel of Matthew. In 2003, the society narrowly decided against expelling Clark Pinnock and John E. Sanders for their beliefs about open theism. In 2007, Francis Beckwith resigned as president after he decided to be received into full communion in the Catholic Church. In 2008, Ray Van Neste and Dennis Burk introduced a proposal to further expand the doctrinal statement to include 11 points, but the motion ultimately failed.

Doctrine
When it was initially formed, the society had a single doctrinal basis, biblical inerrancy. Thus, the original doctrinal statement was limited to one sentence: "The Bible alone and the Bible in its entirety is the word of God written, and therefore inerrant in the autographs." However, it was amended in 1990 to require Trinitarian belief and now includes a second sentence: "God is a Trinity, Father, Son, and Holy Spirit, each an uncreated person, one in essence, equal in power and glory."

Membership
Full, voting membership is available to anyone who has a Master of Theology (Th.M.) degree or its equivalent and subscribes to the above doctrinal statements. Interested evangelicals who do not have such a degree can apply for associate membership, without voting rights. There is also a student membership. Members are not limited to specific denominational or theological traditions and not required to be affiliated with particular schools or seminaries. The number of full members in 2010 was nearly 4,200.

Journal
The society produces a quarterly journal, which contains scholarly articles and book reviews from various evangelical perspectives. First published in 1958, as the Bulletin of the Evangelical Theological Society, its name was changed in 1969 to the Journal of the Evangelical Theological Society (JETS).

Presidents

References

External links
Evangelical Theological Society website
Journal of the Evangelical Theological Society (JETS) website

Protestant theology
Evangelical Theological Society
Christian organizations established in 1949
Theological societies